Brian McLaughlin (born 14 May 1974 in Bellshill) is a Scottish former footballer, who most notably played for Celtic in the early 1990s, and was a Scottish under-21 international.

Career
Educated in Coatbridge, McLaughlin began his professional career with Celtic. He impressed as a youngster and made his league debut in November 1993 under then manager Lou Macari. He stayed at Celtic for another six years, with the bulk of his appearances made under Macari's successor, Tommy Burns.  McLaughlin won his only major winner's medal on 27 May 1995, when Celtic defeated Airdrie 1–0 in the Scottish Cup Final.

After a brief loan period with Airdrie, he left Celtic to join Dundee United on a free transfer. He then had a two-year spell in England with Wigan Athletic, where he scored once in a Football League Trophy tie against Oldham Athletic. In 2001, he returned to Scotland and joined Ayr United, where he scored once against Falkirk. After one season, McLaughlin moved on to Queen of the South, where his only goal ironically came in a 1–0 win over Ayr. His next club was St Johnstone, joining them in 2003, only to return to Queen of the South again after only a year. He finally ended his career at Stenhousemuir, scoring once against Elgin City, before retiring in 2008.

McLaughlin later became a football coach. He was appointed head coach of the Scotland under-17 team in 2017.

Honours
With Celtic:
Scottish Cup: 1995

See also
 Dundee United FC Season 1998-99

References

External links

1974 births
Living people
Ayr United F.C. players
Celtic F.C. players
Dundee United F.C. players
Footballers from Bellshill
Queen of the South F.C. players
St Johnstone F.C. players
Stenhousemuir F.C. players
Wigan Athletic F.C. players
Scottish Premier League players
Scotland under-21 international footballers
Scottish Football League players
English Football League players
Association football wingers
Scottish football managers
Scottish footballers